Wesley Harmon Geer Jr. (born October 28, 1974) is an American guitarist, best known as a founding member of the band Hed PE, formed in 1994 in Huntington Beach, CA. He also toured with nu metal band Korn.

Biography 
Geer was born in Fullerton, California. He met rapper and singer Jared Gomes, while attending local music shows in Orange County, California during the 1990s.  Together they formed the band Hed PE.

Hed PE was signed by Jive Records, and toured with bands like Deftones., System of a Down, and Korn. Geer left the band in 2003, to adopt a different lifestyle, and took a job with Fusion Academy & Learning Center to teach music to children in grades 6–12. 

In 2010, Geer joined Korn. He knew guitar player James "Munky" Shaffer since 1994. After lead guitar player Brian "Head" Welch left the band in 2005, Korn reached out to Geer; he toured and performed live as a guitar player for Korn since 2010, until 2013, when Welch returned to the band.

Rock To Recovery 
In December 2012, Wes Geer started Rock to Recovery, to provide music therapy for addicts. Recovering addicts, victims of abuse, and troubled teens have the opportunity to express themselves through songs that are written by the participants in each session. Each participant in the group forms a "band" with Rock to Recovery staff members (professional musicians in recovery), they write a song with recovery-based lyrics, and in the final session the song is recorded.

In 2016, the Department of Defense granted Rock to Recovery an official contract, to work with the Air Force and Army Wounded Warriors. Rock to Recovery Award Show was created in 2016. The first award show, Rock to Recovery 1, the organization honored Mike Ness and for Rock to Recovery 2, the non-profit honored Corey Taylor and Wayne Kramer.

Discography

Hed P.E. 
 Church of Realities (1995)
 Hed PE (1997)
 Broke (2000)
 Blackout (2003)
 The Best of (həd) Planet Earth (2006)

Korn 
 BBC Sessions (2012)
 Live DVD (2012)

Other musical credits (with Hed PE) 
The Replacement Killers" (1998) — "33"Strangeland (1998) — "Serpent Boy (Radio Edit)"Nativity in Black II (2000) — "Sabbra Cadabra"Dracula 2000 (2000) — "Swan Dive"
"Circus" was a song included in the soundtrack for EA Sports Jeremy McGrath Supercross 2000.Crazy/Beautiful (2001)  — "Killing Time"Tomcats (2001) – "Bartender"3000 Miles to Graceland (2001) — "Killing Time"NASCAR: Crank It Up (2002) — "Crosstown Traffic"Final Destination 2 (2003) — "I Got You"
"Suck It Up" was a song included in the soundtrack for EA Sports Madden NFL 2003.
"Blackout" was a song included in the soundtrack for EA Sports MVP Baseball 2003.
"Get Away" was a song included in the soundtrack for NASCAR Thunder 2003.Final Destination 3'' (2006) — "Killing Time"

References 

American rock guitarists
American male guitarists
Living people
Musicians from Fullerton, California
Guitarists from California
1974 births